Milagro means "miracle" in Spanish. 

Milagro may refer to:

Places:
Milagro, Ecuador, a city
Milagro Canton, Ecuador, of which the city is the canton seat
Milagro River, Ecuador
Milagro, Navarre, Spain, a town and municipality
El Milagro, Quintana Roo, Mexico, a community
El Milagro District, Peru
Milagro (La Rioja), Argentina, a municipality and village

Arts and entertainment:
Milagro (Santana album), by Carlos Santana
Milagro (Jaci Velasquez album)
"Milagro" (The X-Files), an X-Files episode
A fictional village in The Milagro Beanfield War, a 1988 film directed by Robert Redford based on John Nichols novel of the same name

People:
Milagro Sala (born 1964), Argentine activist
Milagro Vargas (born 1955), American opera singer

Other uses:
Milagro (experiment), a gamma ray detector at Los Alamos National Laboratory in New Mexico, USA
Milagro (votive), small metal votive offerings, a Mexican folk tradition
Operación Milagro, a joint health program between Cuba and Venezuela set up in 2005 
Milagro Tequila, a brand of 100% agave tequila

See also
Milagro de amor (disambiguation)
Milagros (disambiguation)